Mary Catherine Chase (religious, Sister Mary Francis de Sales, of the Sisters of the Visitation; pen names, Winnie Rover and F. M. Edselas; 1835 – c. 1905) was a 19th-century American Catholic nun and writer. A fervent Episcopalian for years, she was later influenced by a Catholic woman and entered an enclosed order. Starting in 1874, she wrote under the pen name "Winnie Rover", switching to  "F. M. Edselas" in 1892, when she became a frequent contributor of reminiscences of Ralph Waldo Emerson, Nathaniel Hawthorne, and other great writers.

Early years and education
Mary Catherine Chase was born in Pepperell, Massachusetts, on July 1, 1835, or July 1, 1836. She had one sister, Sarah Augusta Chase (b. 1834). Chase lost her mother as an infant, and was raised by two maternal aunts. First home-schooled, she was later educated in the schools of Springfield, Massachusetts, at Mount Holyoke College, and at the State Normal School of Westfield, Massachusetts, from which she graduated in 1855.

At the age of 19, and under the spiritual guidance of Rev. Alexander Hamilton Vinton, D. D., she was confirmed in St. Paul's Church, Boston, and remained for years a fervent Episcopalian. 
She was a granddaughter of Bishop Philander Chase, and the only known member of the Chase family who later renounced Episcopalianism, after she became a Catholic and a nun.

Career
Having chosen the vocation of a teacher, she drifted to the west. There she met a Catholic woman who influenced her. After entering an enclosed order, Chase took a religious name, but she also felt urged to contribute to literature for young Catholics, and using the pen name of "Winnie Rover", she published books of travel for children, the "Neptune Series", as well as several dramas, and various manuals for the classroom, notably Practical Science.

After 1892, using the pen name of "F. M. Edselas" – an anagram of her religious name, Mary Francis de Sales – she wrote upon subjects of public interest, giving the general impression that the writer was a man, writing such works as "How to Solve a Great Problem", "Institute of Woman's Professions", "Educational Bureau and Journal". The appearance of these articles in a leading Catholic periodical, and the favorable comment they received, resulted in her being chosen as one of the contributors to the Columbian Catholic Congress. Her paper was upon "Woman's Work in Religious Communities". Later, she gained new admirers in the literary world with, "A Visit to Ramona's Home", "In a City of the Clouds", "Constantine Zrumidl", and "What Shall We Do With Our Girls?"

She died c. 1905.

Selected works

As Winnie Rover

 1874, The Neptune outward bound
 1877, The children of to-day : a farce in five acts
 1877, Wealth and wisdom, a drama in six scenes
 1877, The house on the avenue, or, The little mischief-makers : a drama in six scenes
 1879, Lessons in practical science
 1882, The Neptune at the Golden Horn
 1890, The Neptune afloat

As F. M. Edselas

 In a City of the Clouds
 What Shall We Do with Our Girls?
 Mission Lectures to Non-Catholics
 An Educational Bureau and Journal, 1893
 The Wonders of Old Ocean
 The Golden Age and its People
 Checkmated Each Other
 Genoa and Its Campo Santo
 Savonarola--Monk, Patriot, Martyr
 Visit to Ramona's Home
 Institute for Woman's Professions
 Woman's Work in Religious Communities
 How to Solve a Great Problem

Notes

References

Attribution

Bibliography

External links
 

1835 births
1900s deaths
19th-century American writers
19th-century American women writers
19th-century American Roman Catholic nuns
American women children's writers
American children's writers
Mount Holyoke College alumni
Pseudonymous women writers
Westfield State University alumni
Year of death unknown
19th-century pseudonymous writers